Birrema, New South Wales is a civil parish of Harden County, New South Wales.

The parish is at 34°50'54.0"S 148°28'04.0"E on the Murrumbidgee River and the main landmark of the parish is Burrinjuck Dam. The Hume Highway passes along the northern boundary of the parish.

References

Localities in New South Wales
Geography of New South Wales